The Fédération Mondiale du Jeu de Dames (FMJD, World Draughts Federation) is the international body uniting national draughts federations. It was founded in 1947 by four Federations: France, the Netherlands, Belgium and Switzerland.

Members
Currently, the FMJD has more than 70 national federation members in 2021. 
Recently the FMJD has become a member of the Global Association of International Sports Federations and strives for Olympic recognition. 
The FMJD memberships is part of a more general movement toward integration of Mind Sports in the regular sports arena, a development that, in the vision of the FMJD, is to be lauded.

The FMJD is member of the:
General Association of International Sports Federations (GAISF)
International Mind Sports Association (IMSA)

Presidents
 1947: J. H. Willems, 
 1968: Beppino Rizzi, 
 1975: Huib van de Vreugde, 
 1978: Piet Roozenburg, 
 1980: Wim Jurg, 
 1984: Vadim Bairamov, 
 1985: Piet Roozenburg,  (interim)
 1986: Piet Roozenburg, 
 1990: Vadim Bairamov, 
 1991: Chr. H. ten Haaf, 
 1992: Gaetano Mazzilli,  (interim)
 1992: Wouter van Beek, 
 2003: Ivan Shovkoplias, 
 2005: Vladimir Ptitsyn, 
 2009: Harry Otten, 
 2017: Janek Mäggi, 
 2021: Jacek Pawlicki,

Disciplines
International draughts at 100 squares, Russian and Brazilian 64 and checkers:

 Online Checkers - Online Draughts
 Checkers
 64 Russian Draughts and Brazilian Draughts
 Turkish Draughts

Global Championships
 World Checkers/Draughts Championship in English draughts since 1840
 Draughts World Championship in international draughts since 1885
 Women's World Draughts Championship in international draughts since 1873
 Draughts-64 World Championships since 1985
 World Youth Draughts Championships

Regional Championships
 Asian Draughts Championships - Since 1999 
 European Draughts Championships - Since 1999 
 Pan American Draughts Championships - 21st Pan-American Senior International Draughts Championship 2020 Republica Dominicana, April 26 to May 04th, 2020

Regions
 Asian Draughts Confederation As of 2018, has 26 member federations (12 countries are full members and 14 candidate members).
 European Draughts Confederation
 Pan American Draughts Confederation

Members
In June 2021 have 77 members:

Africa (17) / Americas (14) / Asia (12) / Oceania (2) / Europe (32)

Members in 2014:

Africa (16)
  – Fédération Béninoise de Jeu de Dames (FEBEJED) 
  – Federation Burkinabe du Jeu de Dames 
  – Federation Camerounaise de Jeu de Dames 
  – Federation Congolaise du Jeu de Dames FNDA 
  – Federation Ivoirienne du Jeu de Dames 
  – Gambian National Draughts Federation 
  – Federation Guinéenne du Jeu de Dames et des Echecs 
  – Federation Malienne du Jeu de Dames 
  – Federation Mauritanienne du Jeu de Dames 
  – Association Nigérienne du jeu de Dames 
  – Federation Senegalaise du Jeu de Dames 
  – Somali Draughts Sport Association 
  – Mind Sports South Africa 
  – Association du jeu de Dames Togo 
  – Uganda Draughts Federation

Americas (13)
  – Barbados Draughts Association 
  – Confederacao Brasileira de Jogo de Damas 
  – Federation Canadienne du jeu de Dames 
  – Asociacion Costarricense del Juego de Damas 
  – Curaçaose Dambond 
  – Federacion Dominicana de Juego de Damas 
  – Grenada Draughts Association 
  – Federation Haitienne du Jeu de Dames 
  – Jamaica Board Games Foundation 
  – Asociacion Panamena de Juego de Damas 
  – Surinaamse Dambond 
  – Trinidad and Tobago Draughts Association 
  – International Checkers Association of North America / The American Checker Federation / American Pool Checker Association

Asia (8)
  – Chinese Draughts Association 
  – Draughts Federation of India 
  – Japanese draughts association 
  – Draughts Federation of Kazachstan 
  – Mongolian Federation of Draughts 
  – Pak Draughts Federation 
  – Draughts Federation of Turkmenistan 
  – Uzbekistan Draughts Federation

Oceania (2)
  – Australian Draughts Federation
  – New Zealand Draughts Association

Europe (27) 
  – Armenian Draughts Federation
  – Azerbaijan Draughts Federation 
  – Belarus Draughts Federation 
  – Koninklijke Belgische Dambond 
  – Bulgarian Draughts Federation 
  – Croatian Draughts Federation 
  – Ceska Federace Damy 
  – English Draughts Association 
  – Estonian Draughts Federation 
  – Federation francaise du jeu de dames 
  – Georgian Draughts Federation 
  – Interessengemeinschaft Damespiel in Deutschland 
  – Hungary Draughts Federation 
  – Israeli Draughts Federation 
  – Federazione Italiana Dama 
  – Latvian Draughts Union 
  – Lithuanian Draughts Federation 
  – Draughts Federation of Moldova
  – Koninklijke Nederlandse Dambond 
  – Polish Draughts Federation 
  – Federação Portuguesa de Damas 
  – The Draughts Federation of Russia 
  – Slovene Draughts Federation 
  – Federation Suisse du Jeu de Dames 
  – Türkiye Dama Federation 
  – Ukrainian Draughts Federation 
  – Cymdeithas Draffts Cymru

See also

 International draughts
 Draughts
 World Mind Sports Games
 SportAccord World Mind Games

References

External links
FMJD Official website

Draughts organizations
International sports organizations
Sports organizations established in 1947